The Miette Range is a mountain range of the Canadian Rockies located south of Highway 16 near the east border of Jasper National Park, Alberta, Canada.

This range includes the following mountains and peaks:

Mountain ranges of Alberta
Ranges of the Canadian Rockies
Mountains of Jasper National Park